Shantel Jordan is a former U.S. figure skater and member of the United States Figure Skating Team.  She won the U.S. National Championships at the Junior level in 2004 with Jeremy Barrett.  She also won a French pairs title with Barrett and a singles title at the Puerto Rican Championships.

Pairs with Barrett

References

External links 
 Home page
 

American female figure skaters
American figure skating coaches
Living people
Year of birth missing (living people)